East African Bashment Crew (also known as East African Reggae Bashment Crew) is a Kenyan-Ugandan reggae group formed by Bebe Cool from Uganda and his contemporaries. It consists of three members, Bebe Cool from Uganda, and the Kenyan duo Necessary Noize (Kevin Wyre and Nazizi). All of them were already established musicians when the group was formed in 2005. While the members of the group concentrate on their main projects, East African Bashment Crew reunites every now and then.

Their song "Africa Unite" is featured in the African Rebel Music - Roots Reggae & Dancehall compilation album by Out Here Records.

Awards
Won:
2006 Pearl of Africa Music Awards - Song of the Year ("Fire Anthem")
2007 Channel O Music Video Awards - Video Of The Year ("Kube") 

Nominated:
2005 KORA Awards - Best African Reggae/Ragga Act 
2006 Kisima Music Awards - Best Ragga & Best Reggae 
2008 MTV Africa Music Awards - Best Group

References

Kenyan musical groups
Ugandan musical groups
Musical groups established in 2005